Yeovil Town railway station was a railway station serving the town of Yeovil in Somerset, England. The station was on the Yeovil to Taunton Line and also had shuttle services to Pen Mill and Yeovil Junction stations. The station opened on 1 June 1861, replacing an earlier Yeovil Hendford railway station when the line was extended. It closed to passenger traffic on 3 October 1966, but freight and parcels traffic continued to use the station until 3 March 1967, when these services were also withdrawn.

The site today
After closure, the station was demolished and the site was cleared to serve as a car and coach park. A cinema and leisure complex has also been built on part of the site.

References

Further reading 
   

Buildings and structures in Yeovil
Disused railway stations in Somerset
Former Great Western Railway stations
Former London and South Western Railway stations
Railway stations in Great Britain opened in 1861
Railway stations in Great Britain closed in 1966
Beeching closures in England
1861 establishments in England